LA Grand Hotel is a proposed super tall tower by Shenzhen World Group in Los Angeles, California.

The new tower will rise in Downtown Los Angeles's Bunker Hill neighborhood, one block west of the currently under-construction Grand Av Arts/Bunker Hill Metro Rail station.

It is proposed to house 242 condominiums, 559 hotel rooms, and 28,700 square feet of retail along Figueroa St. The proposed complex is currently in the design/funding process. No timeline has been announced.

The Tower development was placed on hold in 2019 due to corruption allegations between the developer and council member Jose Huizar. The US Attorney's office has filed charges described in public legal papers, accusing the developer to giving $500,000 to an unnamed person.

Design
The LA Grand Hotel development area currently consists of one 13 story tower, it currently operates as the LA Grand Hotel. This building was purchased by Shenzhen World Group in 2010.

The new super-tall tower proposed will be constructed on the northeast corner directly adjacent to the 13 story tower on the property. A sleek slender design will make it the new tallest building west of the Mississippi River at the proposed height of 1,108 feet.

The second tower will remain at 13 stories and will be converted and remodeled into apartments.

See also
 List of tallest buildings in Los Angeles

References

External links
 DiMarzio Kato Architects
 SkyscraperCenter 333 S. Fig.

Buildings and structures in Downtown Los Angeles
Proposed buildings and structures in California